Shashi Prabhu (born 1944) is an Indian Architect whose company, Shashi Prabhu & Associates, has designed many Sports Complexes, Hospitals, Club Houses and Infrastructure projects throughout India.

Early life
He was born in Mumbai in 1944 and graduated in Architecture from The Bandra School of Arts in 1966. After completing his schooling at the Balmohan Vidya Mandir, he joined the Poddar College of Commerce where he spent most of his time playing cricket. His fascination for the game eventually led him to design India's first modern stadium, the Wankhede Stadium, in Churchgate, Mumbai.

Projects
His designs include:
 Wankhede Stadium in Mumbai (which has hosted numerous famous cricket matches) and also hosted the 2011 Cricket World Cup Final.
VCA Stadium in Nagpur (the largest cricket stadium in India in terms of field area)
 Indira Gandhi Indoor Stadium in Delhi (which was a venue for the Asian Games in 1992 and the Commonwealth Games in 2010)
 The Sardar Vallabhai Patel Indoor Stadium for National Sports Club of India at Worli, Mumbai.
 The Sir HN Reliance Foundation Hospital in Mumbai.
 The Sports City in Hyderabad (which was a venue for the 2002 National Games of India and the 2003 Afro-Asian Games
 Lilawati Kirtilal Mehta Hospital in Bandra 
 Shree Shiv Chhatrapati Sports Complex in Balewadi, which hosted the National Games in 1995 and the Youth Commonwealth Games in 2008.
 Rajiv Gandhi International Cricket Stadium in Hyderabad

References

External links
Shashi Prabhu and Associates

20th-century Indian architects
Living people
1944 births